Stiacciato is a technique that allows a sculptor to create a recessed or relief sculpture with carving only millimetres deep and with mere scribing. To give the illusion of greater depth, the thickness of the carving gradually decreases from the foreground to the background. In some ways it is more similar to a two-dimensional image than a three-dimensional sculpture. The technique allows the use of perspective in the relief. 

The Renaissance master who also became an art historian of the period, Giorgio Vasari, writes of the technique:

The technique was mainly used in the fifteenth and sixteenth centuries. It was begun and dominated by Donatello. The earliest surviving example is his St. George Freeing the Princess (1416-1417). His other works in the genre include the Pazzi Madonna (1430), The Assumption of the Virgin (Sant'Angelo a Nilo, Naples, 1426-1428) and the background of Herod's Banquet (Siena Baptistery, 1423-1427), along with The Virgin and Child (1426), a work that is ascribed to creation by his studio.

References 

Sculpture techniques
Donatello